In Pakistan, the driving licence is the official document which authorises its holder to operate various types of motor vehicles (depending on the type of licence) on publicly accessible roads. Driving licences can be obtained by submitting an application to any licensing authority in the applicant's district.

Obtaining a driver's licence 
Any person at least 18 years old can apply for a driving licence. The applicant must show their National Identity Card and must be able to read a car number plate from a distance of 20.5 metres (65').

For a new licence the person needs to apply first for a learner's permit.

 The candidate needs to come to the office, in person.
 The candidate needs to show a valid CNIC (Computerised National Identity Card)
 The candidate can only apply in the district of their domicile (In case of the out district, permission may be granted from the concerned MLA/DPO in advance).
 Paste a ticket of PKR 60 for each category e.g. motor bike, car, etc.
 Medical form duly signed from the authorised medical practitioner

Medical tests
After fulfilling the medical tests the applicant is eligible for getting the computerised learner's permit. The learner's permit is valid for six months normally. And after that the person is eligible for a Computerised Driving Licence. In this six months time Candidates have to pass through a series of tests. Phase 1 requires to pass a computerised written test, followed by road signs test. If the candidate fails in any of the phase 1 tests, then the candidate shall retry phase 1 after a gap of 42 days. Passing requires at least 50% correct answers. After Phase 1, Phase 2 is a practical test in which the candidate is tested to drive in narrow spaces, and park in a narrow space. If during the test, the candidate's car touches any of the poles, then a retest can take place after 42 days.

After successfully passing the test the person can get the computerised driving licence which is valid for 5 years or 3 years according to candidate's liking.

Security features 
The National Database & Registration Authority has developed an RFID-based driver's licence that bears a license holder's unique, personal information as well as stores data regarding traffic violations and tickets issued / outstanding penalties. Data is stored in two halves of the chip. One half contains the personal information of the licence holder and cannot be changed or modified. The second half is re-writable, where history of violations can be recorded. At the end of the day, violation data is transferred from the policeman's handheld device to local police station which is then transferred to the central server (at district/state level) through secure channel that ensures data security and integrity. The e-Driver's Licene system has been developed to automatically revoke driving rights in case of traffic violation. Comprehensive data of violations is electronically stored and available to the authorities. The e-driver's licence also allows the authorities to provide for supplementary provisions and services. The RFID driver's licence enables improvements in identity verification, privacy protection and highway safety.

Rules for the licence 
LTV.HTV.PSV

1 Learner's driving permit of motorcycle / motorcar / LTV / HTV / PSV / tractor (agriculture) shall be valid for six months, however the applicant can appear for practical driving test after 42 days
 	 
2 Learner's driving permit of construction / agriculture machinery shall be valid for one year, however the applicant can appear for practical driving test after six months
 	 
3 Foreigners' Driving Licence shall be valid for the duration of valid Pakistani visa
 	 
4 International Driving Permit shall be valid for one year
 	 
5 All other categories of Driving Licences issued under these Rules other than PSV licences shall be valid for 5 years
 	 
6 PSV Licences shall be valid for three years unless otherwise provided in these Rules, cancelled/suspended by the Authority or a competent Court earlier

Categories 
In Pakistan, there are different categories of driving licence.

 Motorcar/jeep: motorcar/jeep driving licence is valid for non-commercial car.
 Motorbike/rickshaw
 LTV: light transport vehicle driving licence is valid for commercial car/taxi, jeep, mini bus, Mazda and lightweight transport.
 HTV: Heavy transport vehicle driving licence is valid for buses, trucks, trailers, cranes, and any type of heavy transport.
 Tractor (agricultural)
 PSV: public service vehicle
 International driver's permit

Verification of licence 
If a person has a valid driving licence in Pakistan, he/she can verify the status of his/her licence through licence authority website of his province. He/she has to put his/her CNIC number to the system. The system provides following information of that licensee.

 Licence number
 Name
 Father/husband name
 City
 Allowed vehicles (M.Cycle, M.Car, Jeep, LTV, HTV etc)
 Issue date
 Valid from
 Valid to

Driving licence Renewal 
Driving licence in Pakistan usually issued for 5 years. After completion of 5 years, a renewal of licence is required for further 5 years. For this purpose, a licensee should visit his nearest driving licence office with required documents. Following documents are required to submit.

 Filled application form
 2 passport size photographs
 A copy of CNIC 331040886441.7
 Current driving licence (expired)
 Required tickets of relevant licence

After completing the process, the licence is posted to the address mentioned in the application form.

See also
 Computerised National Identity Card
 Pakistani passport

References

Pakistan
Road transport in Pakistan